Nachle Ve with Saroj Khan is Dance class show hosted by Saroj Khan. Nachle Ve with Saroj Khan Premiered from 21 January 2008.

Show People

Teachers 
Saroj Khan ... Head Teacher(Headmaster A.k.a. Masterji)
Manish ... Co-teacher Only for Duet Song
Yogesh ... New Teacher (Dard-e-Disco Song Episode Only)
Jasmin and Bhavna...New teachers (only for Jai Jai Shiv Shankar song episode)

Songs 
2010
 25 October:  Munni Badnaam Hui - Dabangg
 28 October:  Tum Jo Aaye Zindagi Mein - Once Upon in Mumbaai
 2 November: Main Tera Dhadkan Teri - Ajab Prem Ki Gajab
 November: Chunari Chunari- Biwi No.1.

Students 
Swati Bajpai ... Also known as Swata for singing boy's line.

Minakshi Dixit 
Bhakti

Shivam (Child - boy)
Piyush (Child - boy)
Sagar (Child - boy)
Rishi basatwar (Child - boy)
Devendra (Child - boy)
Sneha (Child - girl)
Urmin

Neha
DEEPAK

Nikita (child-girl)
Kadambari (child-girl)
Bundini
Gunjan Lal

all the best for watching
Yogesh
Archana
[[Kathak|Rupal

Other 
Nirmalbhai ... Dholki
 Sharad Malhotra and Divyanka Tripathi as Couple Featured On Valentine's Day Special
 Shweta Salve as Guest Contestant
 Gaurav Chopra as Guest Contestant
 Delnaaz Irani as Guest Contestant
 Manav Gohil as Guest Contestant
 Karishma Tanna as Guest Contestant
 Ameesha Patel as Guest Contestant
 Rubina Dilaik and Sriti Jha as Guest Contestants
 Sanjeeda Sheikh and Aamir Ali as Guest Contestants
 Aashka Goradia as Guest Contestant
 Panchi Bora and Jay Bhanushali
 Drashti Dhami
 Rati Pandey

Season 3 2011:
 Jennifer Winget - Finale Host
 Gaurav Khanna as Host
 Vidya Balan - Guest for 'Ooh La La' song
 Ashita & Chaitanya - Winners for episode 'Aivayi Aivayi'
 Shaleen Bhanot & Daljeet Kaur Bhanot - Winners for episode Chammak Challo' against Jay Bhanushali and Mahii Vij
 Ami Trivedi & Jasveer Kaur - Guest for 'Sajna ji vaari vaari' song
 Sukirti Kandpal & Prerna Wanvari - Guest for 'Darling' song from 7 Khoon Maaf

References 

Dance Mela Tournament Details

External links 
Official Site

2008 Indian television series debuts
Indian reality television series
Indian dance television shows
2011 Indian television series endings